The Porong River is a river flowing through Sidoarjo, East Java, Indonesia, about 700 km east of the capital Jakarta. It is one of the main branches of the Brantas River that discharges into Bali Sea, close to the Madura Strait, and is the main outlet for the Lusi mudflow.

Geography
The river flows in the eastern area of Java with predominantly tropical monsoon climate (designated as Am in the Köppen–Geiger climate classification). The annual average temperature in the area is 26 °C. The warmest month is October, when the average temperature is around 28 °C, and the coldest is February, at 22 °C. The average annual rainfall is 2473 mm. The wettest month is January, with an average of 426 mm rainfall, and the driest is August, with 20 mm rainfall.

See also
List of rivers of Indonesia
List of rivers of Java

References

Rivers of East Java
Rivers of Indonesia